Louis Hasselriis (12 January 1844 – 20 May 1912) was a Danish sculptor known for his public statuary.

Early life and education
Hasselriis was born in Hillerød, the son of Herman Edvard Louis H (1815–1907) and Sophie Frederikke Schondel (1802–55). Gis mother had previously been married to pharmacist in Hillerød Ebbe Madsen Andresen, 1802–38) and her new husband took over the pharmacy in connection with their wedding.

Hasselriis apprenticed as a wood carver under Wille and later in the studio of Herman Wilhelm Bissen. He attended the Royal Danish Academy of Fine Arts in 1859–66 and won the small gold medal in 1868 for David forbereder sig til kamp med Goliath.

Career
Hasselriis had his debut at the Charlottenborg Exhibition in 1863. From 1869 and for the rest of his life he lived in Rome, but retained strong links with his homeland and also with the USA. In Denmark he created a statue of William Shakespeare for Helsingør and memorials to national heroes such as Peder Griffenfeld (Copenhagen) and Hans Christian Andersen (Odense)). A copy of his Hans Christian Andersen statue exists in New Jersey.

His memorial to Heinrich Heine marks the poet's grave in Montparnasse cemetery in Paris. A full size statue of the German-Jewish poet was also created for Empress Elizabeth of Austria. After her death it was removed from its original location by the antisemitic Kaiser Wilhelm II, and was rejected when offered to the city of Hamburg. With the rise of the Nazis, it was moved out of Germany to be erected in the Jardin d'acclimatation du Mourillon, Toulon. Though it survived the war, other Hasselriis statues were melted down to make munitions.

Gallery

References

External links

1844 births
1912 deaths
20th-century Danish sculptors
Male sculptors
19th-century sculptors
People from Hillerød Municipality
Danish male artists
20th-century Danish male artists